Andreas Pittaras (born August 3, 1990) is a Cypriot football striker who plays for ASIL Lysi.

External links
 

1990 births
Living people
Cypriot footballers
ASIL Lysi players
Anorthosis Famagusta F.C. players
Chalkanoras Idaliou players
Apollon Limassol FC players
Ethnikos Achna FC players
Ermis Aradippou FC players
Nikos & Sokratis Erimis FC players
Kallithea F.C. players
Othellos Athienou F.C. players
AEZ Zakakiou players
Cyprus under-21 international footballers
Cyprus youth international footballers
Cypriot First Division players
Football League (Greece) players
Expatriate footballers in Greece
Association football forwards
People from Larnaca District